John Baumgarten (May 26, 1902 – November 23, 1963) was an American businessman and politician.

Baumgarten was born in Rockford, Illinois and attended Rockford public schools. Baumgarten worked for the Rockford Screw Products and was the personnel manager. He lived in Rockford, Illinois with his wife. Baumgarten served in the Illinois House of Representatives in 1939 and 1940 and was a Democrat. In 1943, Baumgarten and his wife moved to Cherry Valley, Illinois. He served as mayor of Cherry Valley in 1945. Baumgarten died at Swedish American Hospital in Rockford, Illinois.

Notes

External links

1902 births
1963 deaths
People from Cherry Valley, Illinois
Politicians from Rockford, Illinois
Businesspeople from Illinois
Mayors of places in Illinois
Democratic Party members of the Illinois House of Representatives
20th-century American politicians
20th-century American businesspeople